A special election was held in Delaware's at-large congressional district on October 6, 1807 to fill a vacancy left by the resignation of James M. Broom (F)

Background
He'd won his first term in a special election caused by James A. Bayard's election to the Senate. However, Broom did not serve this second term, instead resigning as well, before the start of the Tenth Congress. A special election was held for his replacement.

Election results

See also
List of special elections to the United States House of Representatives

References

Delaware 1807 at-large
Delaware 1807 at-large
1807 at-large Special
Delaware at-large Special
United States House of Representatives at-large Special
United States House of Representatives 1807 at-large